Julius Elian Røring Sundsvik (16 June 1891 - 11 March 1971) was a Norwegian novelist and newspaper editor.

Born in Brønnøy, Helgeland, he published the novels Slitets folk (1940), Sønnen (1941) and Oppover igjen (1945) with motifs from Northern Norway. He was also the editor-in-chief of Moss Avis in Moss from 1934 to 1964.

References

1891 births
1971 deaths
People from Brønnøy
Norwegian newspaper editors
People from Moss, Norway
20th-century Norwegian novelists